Scinax baumgardneri is a species of frog in the family Hylidae.
It is endemic to Venezuela.
Its natural habitats are subtropical or tropical moist lowland forests and intermittent freshwater marshes.
It is threatened by habitat loss.

References

baumgardneri
Amphibians described in 1961
Taxonomy articles created by Polbot